Chuden Kabimo is an Indian Nepali language writer and journalist based in Kalimpong, India. Kabimo has authored two books. He is best known for his 2018 novel Faatsung, originally written in Nepali and translated into English as Song of the Soil in 2021. 

He won the prestigious Yuva Puraskar in 2018 for his debut book, a collection of short stories titled 1986. His second book Faatsung was published in 2018 and was shortlisted for the Madan Puraskar for the same year. The English translation of the book Song of the Soil, translated by Ajit Baral was also shortlisted for the JCB Prize. Both of his first two works centered around the Gorkhaland movement in India.

Notable Works 

 1986, a short story collection
 Song of the Soil, novel, originally published in Nepali as Faatsung in 2018.

Awards 

 Winner – Sahitya Akademi Yuva Puraskar for Nepali (2018) for 1986.
 Nominated – Madan Puraskar (2018) for Faatsung.
 Nominated – JCB Prize (2022) for Song of the Soil.

References 

Living people
Year of birth missing (living people)
People from Kalimpong district
Nepali-language writers from India
Journalists from West Bengal